In enzymology, a 3-methyl-2-oxobutanoate hydroxymethyltransferase is an enzyme that catalyzes the chemical reaction

5,10-methylenetetrahydrofolate + 3-methyl-2-oxobutanoate + H2O  tetrahydrofolate + 2-dehydropantoate

The 3 substrates of this enzyme are 5,10-methylenetetrahydrofolate, 3-methyl-2-oxobutanoate, and H2O, whereas its two products are tetrahydrofolate and 2-dehydropantoate.

This enzyme belongs to the family of transferases that transfer one-carbon groups, specifically the hydroxymethyl-, formyl- and related transferases. The systematic name of this enzyme class is 5,10-methylenetetrahydrofolate:3-methyl-2-oxobutanoate hydroxymethyltransferase. Other names in common use include alpha-ketoisovalerate hydroxymethyltransferase, dehydropantoate hydroxymethyltransferase, ketopantoate hydroxymethyltransferase, oxopantoate hydroxymethyltransferase, 5,10-methylene tetrahydrofolate:alpha-ketoisovalerate, and hydroxymethyltransferase. This enzyme participates in pantothenate and coa biosynthesis.

Structural studies

References

 
 

EC 2.1.2
Enzymes of known structure